The women's 1000 metres race of the 2014–15 ISU Speed Skating World Cup 3, arranged in Sportforum Hohenschönhausen, in Berlin, Germany, was held on 6 December 2014.

Brittany Bowe of the United States won, followed by Heather Richardson of the United States in second place, and Li Qishi of China in third place. Janine Smit of the Netherlands won Division B.

Results
The race took place on Saturday, 6 December, with Division B scheduled in the morning session, at 09:45, and Division A scheduled in the afternoon session, at 12:55.

Division A

Division B

References

Women 1000
3